Table tennis at the 2013 Southeast Asian Games took place at Wunna Theikdi Indoor Stadium, Naypyidaw, Myanmar between December 17–21.

Medal summary

Medal table

Medalists

All events at the Games took the form of a knockout competition.

Finals

References

 
2013
Southeast Asian Games
2013 Southeast Asian Games events